Penicillifera lactea is a moth in the family Bombycidae. It is found from eastern Afghanistan to India (Assam).

The wingspan is 25–40 mm.

References

Natural History Museum Lepidoptera generic names catalog

Bombycidae
Moths described in 1865